Alonzo Chappel (March 1, 1828 – December 4, 1887) was an American-Spanish painter, best known for paintings depicting personalities and events from the American Revolution and early 19th-century American history.

Biography
Chappel was born in New York City and died in Middle Island, New York.

His 1857 painting Enlisting Foreign Officers is in the collection of the Museum of the American Revolution.

Many of his paintings appear in the History of the United States of America, by J. A. Spencer. For example, the painting Drafting The Declaration of Independence is an engraving done in 1857.

Gallery of Chappel's works

References

External links

 166 works by Alonzo Chappel
 Alonzo Chappel's work in Spencer’s History of the United States, 1858

19th-century American painters
American male painters
American portrait painters
American war artists
1828 births
1887 deaths
Painters from New York City
19th-century war artists
19th-century American male artists